Nalbari railway station is located in the northern part of Nalbari town. It belongs to the Northeast Frontier Railway, Rangiya railway division.

Trains
Several express trains stop at this station, some of them are Alipur Duar Jn-Guwahati Passenger, Alipurduar–Lumding Intercity Express, Guwahati-New Bongaigaon Junction Manas Rhino Passenger, Kamrup Express, Kanchanjungha Express, and the Brahmaputra Mail.

See also
Rangiya railway station

References

External links

Railway stations in Nalbari district
Rangiya railway division